Kazimierz Mazur (8 February 1930 – 27 May 2000) was a Polish modern pentathlete. He competed at the 1960 Summer Olympics.

References

1930 births
2000 deaths
Polish male modern pentathletes
Olympic modern pentathletes of Poland
Modern pentathletes at the 1960 Summer Olympics
People from Chojnice County
Sportspeople from Pomeranian Voivodeship